Rownd a Rownd is a Welsh soap opera created by Rondo Media (formally Ffilmiau’r Nant) and shown on S4C since 11 September 1995. It was claimed to be the first Celtic-related language soap specifically directed at a youth audience. It is set in the fictional harbour town of Glanrafon in Anglesey.

At its inception, the soap was targeted towards an adolescent and young adult audience, but it now has broadened its appeal to all age groups. Beginning with a small cast of characters, the serial now has upwards of forty cast members.

The soap is consistently in the top 20 most watched programmes of the week on S4C, the show currently averaging around twenty thousand viewers per episode. Two episodes are produced each week; since February 2020 these have been broadcast at 20:25 on Tuesdays and Thursdays (with the previous episode being repeated at 18:30). In addition, a weekly omnibus with in-vision English language subtitles airs on Sunday daytime. Every summer Rownd a Rownd also takes a two-month seasonal break, finishing in mid-July and restarting in September to coincide with the new academic year.

Background
Rownd a Rownd was first broadcast in September 1995 and was originally based on young people who did a paper round (hence the programme's title, based on the wheels of a bicycle). It has since grown to include both their daily school life and their family life. Phil Redmond, creator of Grange Hill, Brookside and Hollyoaks, acted as a consultant to the series on its launch in 1995, and again on its tenth anniversary. Rownd a Rownd also has a presence on social networking sites Facebook, Twitter, Instagram and TikTok. In 2016, it celebrated its 21st birthday, with S4C broadcasting an anniversary special hosted by Tudur Owen.

The longest-serving cast member was Iestyn Garlick, who played Jim "Gym" Williams, the physical education teacher, who was later the headmaster of the local school. The character first appeared on-screen in September 1995 and left in July 2020 after 25 years.

Production
 The series is filmed in Menai Bridge, Anglesey and Caernarfon, North Wales, and is produced by Rondo Media (previously known as Ffilmiau Nant). When it began, the production company converted a disused garage in Dale Street (Welsh name: "Lôn Cilbedlam") in Menai Bridge into a fake row of shops, which includes a café, a hairdresser, a newsagent, a taxi firm, a pizza place and a bar. There is a sign outside this set informing the public that the shops are not real. School scenes are filmed in Ysgol Gyfun Llangefni and Ysgol David Hughes. Hospital scenes are often filmed in nearby Ysbyty Gwynedd, Bangor, usually in one of the staff hostels. The soap also regularly makes use of incidental music; in keeping with the show's style, this usually consists of indie-pop music sung in Welsh.

On 18 March 2020 it was announced that filming for Rownd a Rownd would be suspended in the light of the spread of COVID-19. Filming resumed in August 2020 with social distancing guidelines in place. Two additional filming sites were also added to Rownd a Rownd's set in Menai Bridge in order to keep people sufficiently apart; these are located in the near-by towns of Caernarfon and Llangefni.

Cast

Regular characters

Recurring and guest characters

Buildings

References

External links

S4C original programming
Television shows set in Wales
1995 British television series debuts
1990s Welsh television series
2000s Welsh television series
2010s Welsh television series
2020s Welsh television series
1990s British television soap operas
2000s British television soap operas
2010s British television soap operas
2020s British television soap operas
Welsh television soap operas
British teen drama television series
Television productions suspended due to the COVID-19 pandemic